Anasuya is a personage in Hindu mythology. Anasuya may also refer to
Anasuya (film), a 2007 Indian Telugu film
Mahasati Ansuya, a 1943 Indian Hindi film
Mahasathi Anasuya, a 1965 Indian Kannada film
Sati Anasuya, a story that became a basis for several Indian films 
Anasuya (given name)